Nagdaha is a census town in Barrackpore I CD Block of Barrackpore subdivision in North 24 Parganas district in the Indian state of West Bengal. It is a part of Kolkata Urban Agglomeration.

Geography

Location
Palladaha, Nagdaha, Palashi and Srotribati (OG) form an urban cluster east of Kanchrapara. Jetia, Nanna (OG) and Chakla (OG) form another urban cluster south of Kanchrapara.

96% of the population of Barrackpore subdivision (partly presented in the map alongside) live in urban areas. In 2011, it had a density of population of 10,967 per km2 The subdivision has 16 municipalities and 24 census towns.

For most of the cities/ towns information regarding density of population is available in the Infobox. Population data is not available for neighbourhoods. It is available for the entire municipal area and thereafter ward-wise.

All places marked on the map are linked in the full-screen map.

Police station
Naihati police station under Barrackpore Police Commissionerate has jurisdiction over Naihati municipal area and Barrackpore I CD Block, including Barrackpur Cantonment Board.

Demographics
As of the 2011 Census of India, Nagdaha had a population of 8,192; of this, 4,167 are male, 4,025 female. It has an average literacy rate of 76.7%, higher than the national average of 74.04%.

Infrastructure
As per the District Census Handbook 2011, Nagdaha covered an area of 3.0654 km2. Amongst the medical facilities it had was a health centre/ dispensary. Amongst the educational facilities It had were 3 primary schools, and the nearest middle school, secondary school and senior secondary schools were available 3 km away at Palashi.

Transport
Nagdaha is on the Kanchrapara-Haringhata Road.

The nearest railway station is Kanchrapara railway station.

Healthcare
The North 24 Parganas district has been identified as one of the areas where ground water is affected by arsenic contamination.

References

Cities and towns in North 24 Parganas district